Mayavi is a 2006–2007 Indian-Tamil language 3D fantasy adventure thriller series starring Ganesh Venkatraman, Debina Bonnerjee, Gurmeet Choudhary. It was the first Indian 3D series. It aired on Jaya TV every Saturday at 21:00 (IST) for 26 episodes. The series won the Special Prize at Seoul International Drama Awards in 2007, and was the first Indian entry to be on the award list.

Plot 
Vikram (Ganesh Venkatraman) has special powers: each of his five fingers is capable of drawing one of the five basic elements (fire, wind, water, earth, ether). He becomes a living legend in fighting crime, and the nemesis of all evil men throughout the world.

Cast 
 Ganesh Venkatraman as Vikram
 Debina Bonnerjee as Shakthi
 Gurmeet Choudhary as Hiranyan
 Kalidas as Rajaguru
 Master Atharva as Akash
 Ramesh as Gummy

Produced 
The series is produced by Tamil cinema director Mani Ratnam's brother GV Ratnam.
 Creative head – V. Ravee, C.E.O GV films Ltd
 Writer director – R.Elavarasan,B.A.D.F.
 Tech music – Niru
 Camera – Aryan. S.L
 Playback singer – Bhuvanakriti
 Anaglyph technology – K.Yuvarajan
 Graphics – Sanra Software Limited

Awards and nominations

International broadcast 
In India, the series aired as Mayavi in the state of Kerala on Kairali TV dubbed in Malayalam, and in the state of Andhra Pradesh on Zee Telugu dubbed in Telugu from October 2007. It was also dubbed in other languages like Hindi, Marathi, Bengali, Gujarati and Rajasthani for all the others Indian channels.

As The Iron Handed Phantom – Mayavi, the series aired dubbed in South Korea, China (in Mandarin) and Australia. It also aired in Europe.

References

External links 

Jaya TV television series
Tamil-language romance television series
Tamil-language fantasy television series
Tamil-language thriller television series
2000s Tamil-language television series
2006 Tamil-language television series debuts
Tamil-language television shows